"Dozen Girls" is a single by English punk rock band the Damned, released on 17 September 1982 by Bronze Records.

After the experiment of "Lovely Money", the song returned the band to slightly more familiar territory, but failed to chart. The album version released on Strawberries was slightly different from the single version, with the play-out featuring a roll call of a dozen girls replaced by the repeated line "He's alright and he don't care, he's got thermal underwear". Some pressings of the single credited Billy Karloff as a co-writer of "Dozen Girls".

The single was also issued in Bolivia by Philips Records, with "Bad Time for Bonzo" on the B-side.

The song "Torture Me", which appeared on the single, is about the ethics of eating meat. It was composed and performed by Captain Sensible, who was a vegetarian at the time.

Track listing
All songs written by Scabies, Sensible, Vanian.
 "Dozen Girls" - 4:21
 "Take That"  - 2:48
 "Mine's a Large One Landlord" - 1:16
 "Torture Me"  - 1:26

Production credits
Producers
 The Damned
 Hugh Jones on "Dozen Girls" and "Take That"

Musicians
 Dave Vanian − vocals
 Captain Sensible − guitar, vocals on "Take That" and "Torture Me", keyboards
 Rat Scabies − drums
 Paul Gray − bass

References

External links

1982 singles
The Damned (band) songs
Songs written by Rat Scabies
Songs written by Captain Sensible
Songs written by David Vanian
1982 songs
Bronze Records singles